Anableps anableps, the largescale four-eyes, is a species of four-eyed fish found in fresh and brackish waters of northern South America and Trinidad.  This species grows to a length of  TL.  This fish can occasionally be found in the aquarium trade. The fish does not actually have four eyes, but instead each eye is split into two lobes by a horizontal band of tissue, each lobe with its own pupil and separate vision. This allows the fish to see above and below the surface of the water at the same time.

Taxonomy

This fish was first described in 1758 by the Swedish naturalist Carl Linnaeus in the tenth edition of his Systema Naturae. Linnaeus gave it the name Cobitis anableps, but it was later transferred to the genus Anableps, becoming Anableps anableps.

Description
Anableps anableps is a slender elongate fish that can reach . Male fish have the anal fin modified into an intromittent organ with the tip angled to one side. Female fish have a flap of skin covering either the left or right genital opening. The most distinctive feature of this fish is the eyes, which project prominently from the head. Each eye is divided lengthwise and thus has two pupils; the fish positions itself in such a way that the dividing line between the two parts of the eye lies on the surface of the water, so that one pupil has an aerial view while the other is submerged.

Distribution and habitat
Anableps anableps is found in the tropical western Atlantic Ocean and the southern Caribbean Sea. Its range extends from Trinidad and Venezuela to the delta of the Amazon River in Brazil. It mostly occurs in estuaries and on coastal mudflats, but it can survive in freshwater environments for extended periods.

Ecology
Anableps anableps feeds on insects and other small invertebrates (such as small crabs), small fish, and on algae. It has occasionally been observed catching insects in the air, but otherwise it ingests prey on or near the surface. It also ingests silt, consuming the diatoms found among the grains. In mangrove areas of Brazil, it has a migration pattern synchronized with the tides; as the tide rises it enters the intertidal channels, feeding in the inundated mangroves at high water, and retreating to the main channels as the tide ebbs. Feed consumption was at its greatest around high water during daylight spring tides and was at its minimum at night-time neap tides, perhaps demonstrating the importance of the split-level eyes. Red intertidal algae (Catenella sp.) was the main food item, supplemented by insects and shore crabs, family Grapsidae.

In the water, the fish uses a combination of biting and suction to capture its prey. It sometimes emerges from the water and feeds on mudbanks, but its mouth is not well adapted for picking up food from the surface on dry land. Anableps anableps solves this difficulty by depressing the lower jaw and protruding the upper jaw, and ingesting the prey by suction. If the prey is too large to swallow, it is gripped by the teeth, the upper jaw is retracted and the fish bites the prey. This cycle of protrusion and biting can be repeated until the prey is able to be swallowed.

This fish has internal fertilisation and bears live young.

References

Anablepidae
Freshwater fish of South America
Fish of French Guiana
Fish of Guyana
Fish of Suriname
Fish of Trinidad and Tobago
Fish described in 1758
Taxa named by Carl Linnaeus